Lahore Grammar School (LGS) is an elite private school system based in the city of Lahore, Punjab, Pakistan, with branches spread throughout the country.

The system was established in 1979 at its 55 Main Gulberg campus. Today, LGS has multiple branches in Pakistan. There are six branches in the Johar Town area, four branches in the Gulberg area, several branches in DHA, including one in Phase V and one in Phase I, State Life and one built in Paragon City in 2009. These branches are spread out across the country and offer private education to boys and girls from Preschool to A Levels. They also offer the IB Primary Years Programme. LGS has campuses in Faisalabad, Gujranwala, Sargodha, Gujrat, Islamabad, Karachi, Lahore, Multan, Rahim Yar Khan, Peshawar, Quetta, Sialkot, Sheikhupura, Wah Cantt, and Dera Ghazi Khan.

History 
Lahore Grammar School was established in January 1979. The first branch of LGS was the 55 Main Gulberg branch.
They also opened LandMark Branches

Co-Curricular 

The School's co-curricular activities range from educational events to sports programs. Most of the branches have ecological and environmental societies, which campaign against the degreening of Lahore and the concomitant decline in Lahore's air quality. Many branches have a community service program, proving students with opportunities to volunteer at organisations. Some of these include the Pakistan Society for the Rehabilitation of the Disabled, the Rising Sun Institute, Fatima Memorial Hospital, the Human Rights Commission of Pakistan (HRCP), and Shaukat Khanum Memorial Hospital.

Different clubs are arranged for academic interests, including debating and MUN societies, with teenagers participating in tournaments both locally and internationally.

Bonfires are an annual tradition for junior branches. Each branch has its own event.  The event is an opportunity for pupils to take a break from schoolwork and interact with each other.

Annual Interschool events are also held, including Grammania, TSMUN, Grammathon, Grammun and Grammanation. These events usually host up to 500 delegates and are mainly managed by the student body, therefore contributing to their skills outside the classroom. The events are mostly followed by social events such as concerts, talent shows, fashion walks and qawwali nights.

Concerts by musical bands are held annually. The bands may be local or the school's own bands. All major branches put on an annual play, in Punjabi, Urdu or English. Plays like Andhera Ujala were screened on television channels whereas Khatra-e-Jaan which had a number of LGS participants also received favorable reviews across Lahore. The school's network has gone on educational trips to Lahore, all over Pakistan and to abroad countries including Germany, India, China, the United States, Uzbekistan, Greece, Spain, and Egypt.

Students 
The school has a total of 16,000–24,000 students in all of its branches combined. Most students are:

 Children of overseas Pakistanis
 Children of politicians 
 Children of employees that work at Lahore Grammar School
Children of Upper Middle Class families

Subjects 
There are 5 compulsory subjects for O Levels:
 Maths
 Islamiyat
 Urdu Syllabus A or B
 Pakistan studies
 English
They also offer the following optional subjects for O Levels:

 Biology
 Chemistry
 Physics
 Cambridge O level history
 ICT
 Computer science
 Global perspectives (mandatory from Grade 9–10)
 Economics
 Commerce
 Accounting
 Literature
 Sociology
 Environmental management
 Arts & design
 Additional maths

Controversy

Events 
In June 2020, teachers working for LGS Gulberg had been accused of sexual misconduct by students.

Female students and alumni from LGS 1-A/1 (LGS Gulberg) exposed faculty members for inappropriate behaviour and sexual harassment publicly due to LGS's administration not taking appropriate action. Such behavior had been claimed to have been happening for many years. Four teachers were suspended.

Multiple other staff members, including the principal, were also suspended by LGS management following claims indicating they were suppressing complaints against misconduct, and slut-shaming the girls for their clothing.

See also 
 Army Burn Hall College
 Lawrence College, Murree

References

External links 
 

School systems in Pakistan
Schools in Lahore
High schools in Pakistan
Private schools in Pakistan
Educational institutions established in 1979
1979 establishments in Pakistan